The NBL Canada Sixth Man of the Year Award, is an annual National Basketball League of Canada award given since the 2011–12 season. It is awarded to the league's best performing player for his team coming off the bench as a substitute (or sixth man). All award winners up to the 2017–18 season have been born in the United States.

Winners

References

National Basketball League of Canada awards